Balkánský sýr is a type of white brined cheese produced from cow's milk in Czech Republic and Slovakia. It is a salty semi-hard white cheese, analogous to Bulgarian sirene and Greek feta. It is usually not matured.

It is mainly used as a substitute of sirene in the Bulgarian shopska salad or instead of feta in greek salad.

See also

References

Czech cheeses
Slovak cheeses
Brined cheeses